USS LST-332 was one of 390 tank landing ships (LSTs) built for the United States Navy during World War II.

LST-332 was laid down on 29 October 1942 at the Philadelphia Navy Yard; launched on 24 December 1942; sponsored by Mrs. G. W. Henderson; and commissioned on 6 February 1943.

Service history
During World War II, LST-332 was assigned to the European theater and participated in the Sicilian occupation (July 1943), Salerno landings (September 1943), and Invasion of Normandy (June 1944).

Upon her return to the United States, she was decommissioned on 22 May 1945 for conversion to landing craft repair ship USS Feronia (ARL-45) at the New York Navy Yard. The conversion was canceled 12 September 1945 and the ship reverted to LST-332; she was struck from the Naval Vessel Register on 12 March 1946. On 17 October 1946 the tank landing ship was sold to the Suwannee Steamship Company of Charleston, South Carolina for conversion to merchant service.
 
LST-332 earned three battle stars for World War II service.

See also
 List of United States Navy LSTs

References

 
 

World War II amphibious warfare vessels of the United States
Ships built in Philadelphia
1942 ships
LST-1-class tank landing ships of the United States Navy